Hsu Cheng-kuang (born 16 February 1943) is a Taiwanese politician. He was the Minister of the Mongolian and Tibetan Affairs Commission (MTAC) of the Executive Yuan in 2000–2002.

MTAC Ministry

Dalai Lama visit to Taiwan
Commenting on the upcoming visit by Dalai Lama Tenzin Gyatso to Taiwan in October 2000, Hsu said that the visit will be in his capacity of a noted international religious leader at the invitation of a local civilian organization. He added that the MTAC would concentrate on cultural, economic and academic exchanges affairs rather than political affairs towards Tibet.

ROC-CTA relations
In April 2001, Hsu said that the ROC government would improve relations with the Central Tibetan Administration (CTA) government despite the fact that Tibet is still technically part of the Republic of China. Although there have been many misunderstandings between ROC and CTA due to history and lack of proper channel between the two sides, Hsu said that the MTAC would improve contact with the CTA and provide services to the Tibetan people in the ground of humanitarianism.

See also
 Mongolian and Tibetan Affairs Commission
 Republic of China–Mongolia relations
 Mongolia
 Tibet Autonomous Region
 Executive Yuan

References

1943 births
Diplomats of the Republic of China
Government ministers of Taiwan
Living people